José Antonio Fernández de Castro (January 18, 1887 in Havana – July 30, 1951 in Havana) was a notable Cuban journalist and writer active in the first part of the 20th century.

In 1917 he graduated with a law degree from the University of Havana.  Long interested in journalism and historical investigation, he worked with the newspapers El Fígaro and La Nación.  He directed the literary page of Diario de la Marina from 1927 to 1929, using it as a platform to support the contemporary Spanish avant-garde literary movements, often called the vanguardia.  He collaborated on a number of anti-imperialist publications such as Venezuela Libre and América Libre, and later became involved in Communist activities.  He was, for example, one of the first Cuban writers to study the poetry of the October Revolution.  He served as a diplomat between 1934 and 1944.  He died on July 30, 1951, in his native Havana.

His most important works include a compilation of the letters of José Antonio Saco, published under the title Medio siglo de historia colonial de Cuba (1923).  In addition, he published the anthology La poesía moderna en Cuba (1926) and a collection of his best journalism En Barraca de feria (1933).

External links
 See José Antonio Fernández de Castro's introduction and notes to Escritos de Domingo del Monte, published in Habana, Cuba in 1929.
 See related Cuban law and literature primary documents in the Digital Library of the Caribbean.

Cuban journalists
Male journalists
1887 births
1951 deaths
People from Havana
University of Havana alumni
20th-century journalists